Nicholson was launched at Liverpool in 1802 as a slave ship in the triangular trade in enslaved people. She made four complete voyages as a slave ship. Then when the Slave Trade Act 1807 ended British participation in the trans-Atlantic slave trade she started trading with Brazil. She was wrecked in 1810 returning to Liverpool from Pernambuco.

Career
Nicholson first appeared in Lloyd's Register (LR) in 1802.

1st slave voyage (1802–1803): Captain Richard Pearson, sailed from Liverpool on 20 September 1802, bound for Africa. Nicholson arrived at Havana in April 1803 with 274 slaves. She arrived back at Liverpool on 23 August. She had left Liverpool with 28 crew members and she had suffered four crew deaths on the voyage.

2nd slave voyage (1804–1805): Captain Richard Pearsons acquired a letter of marque on 17 January 1804. He sailed from Liverpool on 18 February and gathered slaves at Loango. Nicholson arrived at Havana in October 1804 with 273 slaves. (She had fist stopped at Demerara and from there had sailed to Suriname.) She sailed for Liverpool from Havana on 8 December and arrived back there on 5 March 1805. She had left Liverpool with 40 crew members and had suffered two crew deaths on her voyage.

However, Lloyd's List reported that Nicholson, Pearson, master, had arrived at Liverpool from Havana on 21 January 1805. It further reported that Nicholson, from Havana, had put into Dublin in distress. She had been on shore and greatly damaged her cargo, which had to be unloaded to lighten her.

3rd slave voyage (1806–1807): Captain William Kermod acquired a letter of marque on 31 May 1806. Captain Kermode sailed from Liverpool on 13 June. He acquired slaves at the Congo River and arrived at Charleston with 360 slaves on 15 December. Nicholson sailed for Liverpool on 3 March 1807 and arrived there on 12 April. She had Liverpool with 42 crew members and had suffered three crew deaths on her voyage.

4th slave voyage (1807–1808): Captain Kermode sailed from Liverpool on 1 June 1807. He acquired slaves at the Congo River. Nicholson arrived at Demerera in February 1808. She sailed for Liverpool on 23 June and arrived back there on 13 August. She had left Liverpool with 36 crew members and had suffered five crew deaths on her voyage. She returned to Liverpool with sugar, coffee, cotton, and wine.

With the end of the slave trade new owner sailed Nicholson in the trade with Brazil.

Fate
As Nicholson was attempting to enter the docks at Liverpool from Pernambuco, in September 1810, the tide receded, leaving her dry. As she was a sharp vessel, with a heavy cargo, she sustained considerable damage.

Notes

Citations

References
 

1802 ships
Liverpool slave ships
Age of Sail merchant ships of  England
Maritime incidents in 1805
Maritime incidents in 1810